Wendish Schafkopf, Wendisch or Wendsch is a card game for four players that uses a Schafkopf pack of German-suited cards or a Skat pack of French playing cards.

Aim 
The aim of the game is for each partnership of two to score at least 61 card points by taking tricks.

Cards

Ranking 
Each suit consists of 6 (24-card game) or 8 cards (32-card game) whose ranking in terms of trick-taking power (beginning with the highest) is:
Ace (Ass) > Ten (Zehner) > King (König) > Nine (Neuner) > Eight (Achter) > Seven (Siebener). The Queens (Damen) or Obers and Jacks (Buben) or Unters do not count as part of their suits, but act as permanent trumps (see below).

Card points

Trumps
The trumps are fixed from the start. If playing with a French-suited pack, the highest trumps are the Queens in the sequence Clubs, Spades, Hearts and Diamonds. Then follow the Jacks in the same ranking order. As an additional suit, Diamonds are always trumps, the hierarchy of the card values within the trump suit remaining (see above). In a German-suited pack the highest trumps are the Obers in the sequence Acorns, Leaves, Hearts and Bells, followed by the Unters in the same order and then the rest of the permanent trump suit of Bells.

As a result, there is a total of 14 trumps. The two top Queens, Q and Q, or, in a German- suited pack, the two top Obers, O and O, are known as the Old Ones (Alten). The players with the Old Ones play as partners against the other two.

Playing

Dealing 
The dealer is chosen by lot; the player who draws the highest card becomes the dealer. The cards are dealt in 2 packets of 4 cards each, giving a hand of 8 cards.

Contracts

Normal game 
Wendish Schafkopf is a game of partners. The players with the two Old Ones always form a team. If one player is dealt both, he has 2 options. The first is to choose a partner by saying something like "the Ace of Leaves is with me" or "I'll have the Ace of Clubs". The player with that card becomes his partner, but must play that card as soon as possible. He can also say "the first to win a trick is with me" whereupon the first other player to take a trick becomes the partner. The second option is that the player opts to go Solo against the other 3 players.

Hochzeit 
If a player has both Old Ones in his hand, he may decide whether to play a Solo or a Hochzeit ("Wedding"). If he goes for a Hochzeit, he 'calls' (ruft) his playing partner. Unlike Bavarian Schafkopf it does not have to be an ace, the player may choose any card. He can however specify that the person who takes the first trick will be his partner. He announces this by saying "the first of you to take a trick is with me!" ( "Der erste fremde Stich geht mit!").

Solo 
If a player with both Old Ones thinks his hand is strong enough to contest the game alone, he doesn't say anything (like the "Quiet Wedding", stille Hochzeit in Doppelkopf) and plays a Quiet Solo (stilles Solo) against the other players. Trumps remain the same.

In the Lust Solo contract, a player announces immediately after the cards are dealt, that he will play on his own. Queens and Jacks / Obers and Unters remain the permanent trumps. The additional trump suit may be specified by the soloist. As well as Diamond Solo (Karo-Solo), he may announce Club Solo (Kreuz-Solo), Spade Solo (Pik-Solo) or Heart Solo (Herz-Solo). The soloist in Lust Solo does not have to have the two black Queens. By agreement it can be specified that each player must play a certain number of Solo rounds within a game; this is known as Muss Solo.

Trick-playing rules 
In Wendish Schafkopf players must follow suit (Farbzwang), which means that they must always play a card of the same suit as that led. There is no compulsion to win the trick (Stichzwang) nor does a player have to play a trump card (Trumpfzwang) if he isn't able to follow suit.

Scoring 
The side with the Old Ones (or the soloist) wins if they have scored at least 61 points. The side with fewer than 30 points is Schneider and a side with no tricks at all is Schwarz ("black").
Scoring is determined on the basis of prior agreement. It is customary to play from a kitty into which each player deposits a certain amount of coins or counters before the start of the game.

Variants 
As in many card games, there are several variants of Wendish Schafkopf:

Dreiwendsch 
Basically the same rules apply to Dreiwendsch, a game for three players, as for Wendish Schafkopf. The dealing of cards is the same as in Skat, packets of 3-4-3. However, two cards are not placed in the middle after 1st packet, but only after 2nd packet. These 2 cards are taken up by the player with the O / Q (or, if pre-agreed, by forehand) and exchanged for 2 others. This player becomes the soloist; the other two players together form the opposing team. In Dreiwendsch there are only solo games.
If none of the three players wants to play a solo game, everyone plays against everyone else.

Dreiwendsch with sharp cards 
This is a three-hand game with so-called 'sharp cards': all the nines, eights and sevens are removed from the deck, leaving only 20 cards in play. Each player is dealt 6 cards. In this variant, 2 cards are placed in the skat.

Two-Player Wendish Schafkopf 

Also called Officers' Schafkopf, this game requires the full deck of 32 cards. Each player receives 16 cards: being dealt 2 rows of cards face down, with 4 cards face up on each row. A face-up card is then placed on each of these cards, so that each player has 8 cards face down and 8 cards face up. You are also not allowed to see your own hidden cards at the beginning. First you play with the visible cards. When a card is played, the face down card underneath it is turned over. Permanent trump cards are the Queens and Jacks as well as all cards in the suit of Diamonds. Otherwise the rules of the Wendish Schafkopf already described apply. The game bears a resemblance to Officers' Skat in terms of the distribution of cards, the game situation (cards revealed) and the game principle, but differs culturally, in the number of trumps and the pattern of cards used.

References

Literature 
 Danyliuk, Rita. 1 x 1 der Kartenspiele: Von Bridge über Poker und Skat bis Zwicken. 19th edition. Hanover: Humboldt (2017). pp. 38-42. 
 Grupp, Claus D (1975/1979). Kartenspiele im Familien und Freundeskreis. Überarbeitete und neugestaltete Ausgabe. Originalausgabe. Falken, Niedernhausen/ Ts.  (Dreiwendsch variant)
 Kastner, Hugo & Gerald Kador Folkvord (2005). Die große Humboldtenzyklopädie der Kartenspiele. Humboldt, Baden-Baden.  
 

Schafkopf group
French deck card games
German card games
Four-player card games
German deck card games
Point-trick games